Bluejean Bop! is the debut studio album by American rockabilly singer and his backing band Gene Vincent and His Blue Caps, featuring rock and roll music as well as covers of pop standards. It was released in 1956 on the Capitol label. Bluejean Bop! was followed by Gene Vincent and His Blue Caps.

Track listing
"Bluejean Bop" (Hal Levy, Gene Vincent) – 2:35
"Jezebel" (Wayne Shanklin) – 2:38
"Who Slapped John?" (Tex Davis, Vincent) – 2:07
"Ain't She Sweet" (Milton Ager, Jack Yellen) – 2:44
"I Flipped" (Richard Penniman, Chilton Price) – 2:38
"Waltz of the Wind" (Fred Rose) – 2:59
"Jump Back, Honey, Jump Back" (Hadda Brooks) – 2:11
"Wedding Bells (Are Breaking Up That Old Gang of Mine)" (Sammy Fain, Irving Kahal, Willie Raskin) – 2:45
"Jumps, Giggles and Shouts" (Davis, Vincent) – 3:06
"Up a Lazy River" (Sidney Arodin, Hoagy Carmichael) – 2:35
"Bop Street" (Tex Davis, Cliff Gallup) – 2:38
"Peg O' My Heart" (Alfred Bryan, Fred Fisher) – 2:27

Personnel
 Gene Vincent – guitar, vocals

The Blue Caps
 "Galloping" Cliff Gallup – lead guitar
 "Wee" Willie Williams – rhythm guitar
 "Jumpin'" Jack Neal – upright bass
 "Be-Bop" Dickie Harrell – drums

References 

1956 debut albums
Gene Vincent albums
Capitol Records albums
Albums produced by Ken Nelson (United States record producer)